Phalanger (from the Greek phalangion, meaning spider's web, from their webbed (fused) toes) is a genus of possums. Its members are found on New Guinea, the Maluku Islands, other nearby small islands, and Australia's Cape York Peninsula. They are marsupials of the family Phalangeridae, and are one of the four genera whose species are commonly referred to as cuscuses.

Genus Phalanger
Gebe cuscus, P. alexandrae
Mountain cuscus, P. carmelitae
Ground cuscus, P. gymnotis
Eastern common cuscus, P. intercastellanus
Woodlark cuscus, P. lullulae
Blue-eyed cuscus, P. matabiru
Telefomin cuscus, P. matanim
Southern common cuscus, P. mimicus
Northern common cuscus, P. orientalis
Ornate cuscus, P. ornatus
Rothschild's cuscus, P. rothschildi
Silky cuscus, P. sericeus
Stein's cuscus, P. vestitus

References

External links 
 
 

Possums
Marsupials of Oceania
Marsupial genera
Taxa named by Gottlieb Conrad Christian Storr